False Prophets is an EP by Mentallo & The Fixer, released on October 14, 1997 by Metropolis Records. It contains remixes of the tracks "False Prophets" and "Mother of Harlots",  which previously appeared on the band's fourth studio album Burnt Beyond Recognition, as well as previously unreleased track titled "Deluge 2370 B.C.E."

Reception

Sonic Boom recommended False Prophets to "die-hard Mentallo fans, as well as club oriented DJ's, will want to pick up a copy of this single, while the rest of you are should pick up the full length album instead."

Track listing

Personnel
Adapted from the False Prophets liner notes.

Mentallo & The Fixer
 Dwayne Dassing (as The Fixer) – sampler, synthesizer, sequencing, programming (1, 3), engineering and remixer (1)
 Gary Dassing (as Mentallo) – vocals, sampler, synthesizer, effects, engineering (2-4), programming (2, 3), programming (3), remixer (4)

Additional performers
 John Bustamante – Moog synthesizer (1)
 Jon Pyre – additional production (2, 4)

Production and design
 Travis Baumann – cover art, illustrations
 Chaos Grafix – design
 James Mendez – mastering, editing and remixer (1, 2)

Release history

References

External links 
 

1997 EPs
Mentallo & The Fixer albums
Metropolis Records EPs
Off Beat (label) EPs